The Dr. Moses Mason House is a historic house museum at the northeast corner of Broad Street and Mason Street in Bethel, Maine.  Built c. 1813–15, it is notable as the home of one of Bethel's early doctors and first postmaster, Moses Mason (1789-1866), and for the murals drawn on some of its walls by the itinerant artist (among other professions he engaged) Rufus Porter.  The building was listed on the National Register of Historic Places in 1972; it is now owned by the Museums of the Bethel Historical Society, and is open year-round for tours (by appointment only in the colder months).

Description
The Mason House is a -story wood-frame structure, five bays wide and one deep, with two interior chimneys.  It stands facing the Bethel Green as one of a number of graceful Federal period houses.  The house is finished in white clapboards and rests on a granite foundation.  A rear leanto addition extends the house to the rear.  The main entrance is centered on the front (west-facing) facade; it features sidelight windows and a broad elliptical fanlight, framed by pilasters and topped by a cornice.

The interior of house has been modernized, but its principal showcase, murals in the central hall and stairwell, have been preserved, as has some of its woodwork.  These were painted, probably c. 1830, by the itinerant artist Rufus Porter, and show harbor and woodland scenes typical of his work.

Dr. Moses Mason, for whom the house was built c. 1813, was apprenticed to a local doctor before beginning his practice.  He served as Bethel's first postmaster, and as a town selectman, trustee of the Gould Academy, and as a two-term representative in the United States Congress.  After his death the house passed to Ada Durrell, a daughter of cousins, who the Masons had raised.  Her descendants gave the house to the Museums of the Bethel Historical Society in 1971.

The society now maintains the property as a historic house museum, open for regular tours in the summer and by appointment at other times.

See also
National Register of Historic Places listings in Oxford County, Maine

References

External links
Museums of the Bethel Historical Society - Dr. Moses Mason House

Houses on the National Register of Historic Places in Maine
Federal architecture in Maine
Houses completed in 1813
Houses in Oxford County, Maine
Buildings and structures in Bethel, Maine
Historic house museums in Maine
Historical society museums in the United States
Museums in Oxford County, Maine
National Register of Historic Places in Oxford County, Maine
Historic district contributing properties in Maine